Firdousi is a crater on Mercury. It has a diameter of 98 kilometers. Its name was adopted by the International Astronomical Union (IAU) in 2010. Firdousi is named for the Iranian poet Hakim Ferdowsi, who lived from 940 to 1020.

References

Ferdowsi
Impact craters on Mercury